The World Junior Alpine Skiing Championships 2009 were the 28th World Junior Alpine Skiing Championships, held between 29 February and 8 March 2009 in Garmisch-Partenkirchen, Germany.

Medal winners

Men's events

Women's events

External links
World Junior Alpine Skiing Championships 2009 results at fis-ski.com

World Junior Alpine Skiing Championships
2009 in alpine skiing
Alpine skiing competitions in Germany
2009 in German sport
Sport in Garmisch-Partenkirchen